Deniz Mendi (born 27 February 1979) is a retired Turkish-Swiss football forward.

Mendi played his youth football with local club FC Klus-Balsthal. He joined FC Basel's first team for their 1997–98 season under head coach Jörg Berger. After playing in four test games Mendi played his domestic league debut for his new club in the away game in the Stadion Kleinfeld on 10 August 1997 as Basel were defeated 1–3 by Kriens. He scored his first goal for the club on 8 November in the home game in the St. Jakob Stadium, in fact he scored the first two goals in the game, as Basel won 4–1 against Kriens in the return match.

In his first two seasons with the club, Mendi was used mainly as substitute. In his third season, after two appearances in the 1999 UEFA Intertoto Cup, he was loaned out to second tier FC Winterthur until the end of the calendar year. For the second half of the season he was on loan by Young Boys, who at that time also played in the second tier. After a third loan period in the lower league with FC Baden Mendi decided to leave the club. During his time with the club, Mendi played a total of 59 games for Basel scoring a total of 5 goals. 30 of these games were in the Nationalliga A, 1 in the Swiss Cup, 2 in the UI Cup and 26 were friendly games. He scored 2 goals in the domestic league, the other 5 were scored during the test games.

Mendi moved on to İstanbulspor, but this did not work out and he transferred to Étoile Carouge. After a number of seasons with various amateur clubs Mendi retired from active football.

References

Sources
 Rotblau: Jahrbuch Saison 2017/2018. Publisher: FC Basel Marketing AG. 
 Die ersten 125 Jahre. Publisher: Josef Zindel im Friedrich Reinhardt Verlag, Basel. 
 Verein "Basler Fussballarchiv" Homepage

1979 births
Living people
Swiss people of Turkish descent
FC Basel players
FC Winterthur players
BSC Old Boys players
FC Baden players
İstanbulspor footballers
Étoile Carouge FC players
FC Solothurn players
FC Grenchen players
FC Wangen bei Olten players
Association football defenders
Swiss Super League players
Swiss men's footballers
Sportspeople from the canton of Solothurn